In Greek mythology, Megareus (Ancient Greek: Μεγαρεύς) may refer to:

Megareus, king of Onchestus in Boeotia and father of Hippomenes.
Megareus, son of Eurydice of Thebes, and a defender of Thebes during the war of the Seven against Thebes.

Notes

References 

 Aeschylus, translated in two volumes. 1. Seven Against Thebes by Herbert Weir Smyth, Ph. D. Cambridge, MA. Harvard University Press. 1926. Online version at the Perseus Digital Library. Greek text available from the same website.
 Gaius Julius Hyginus, Fabulae from The Myths of Hyginus translated and edited by Mary Grant. University of Kansas Publications in Humanistic Studies. Online version at the Topos Text Project.

Characters in Greek mythology